Bill Ward may refer to:

Bill Ward (actor) (born 1967), English actor
Bill Ward (American football) (1921–1992), offensive guard in American football in the National Football League
Bill Ward (British artist) (1927–1996), British erotic artist
Bill Ward (cartoonist) (1919–1998), "good girl art" cartoonist
Bill Ward (footballer, born 1891) (1891–1978), Australian rules footballer for St Kilda
Bill Ward (footballer, born 1901) (1901–1969), Australian rules footballer for St Kilda
Bill Ward (musician) (born 1948), drummer for Black Sabbath
Billy Ward (rugby league) (1888–?), English rugby league footballer who played in the 1900s, 1910s and 1920s

See also
Billy Ward and his Dominoes, American R&B group of the 1950s
William Ward (disambiguation)